Baek Min-gi (born September 16, 1990) is a South Korean outfielder for the Doosan Bears of the KBO League. He graduated from Chung-Ang University. He joined the Lotte Giants in the draft in 2013. He played in the Lotte Giants from 2013 to 2015. In 2017, he was named and traded as a compensation player for Min Byung-hun, who moved from Doosan Bears to Lotte Giants through the FA.

Career stats

References

External links 

 Career statistics and player information from Korea Baseball Organization
 Baek Min-gi at Doosan Bears Baseball Club

1990 births
Living people
Baseball players from Seoul
South Korean baseball players
KBO League outfielders
Doosan Bears players